Pig Farm is a town in the Accra Metropolitan district. Pig Farm has now surpassed Maamobi and Nima in crime rates. Pig Farm  has recorded the highest school dropouts in the Ayawaso constituency. It has one of the highest crime rates in the country  district of the Greater Accra Region of Ghana. The 2019 edition of Ghana's strongest was won by a man by name Shakazulu who is located at Pig Farm.

References

Populated places in the Greater Accra Region